Paul Davis (born 1962), also referred to as Tegat Davis, is a former Jamaican international football player.

Career

Club
In 1991, he was awarded the top goalscorer and the most valuable player awards at the 1991 Caribbean Cup.

He played for Seba United F.C. in the Jamaican Premier Division and also played in Israel for four years. He now works as a manager.

International

Davis won 61 caps for Jamaica at the senior level and scored 18 goals.

Management career 
From 2010 to 2012 he worked as the manager of Arnett Gardens.

In 2016, Davis was named manager of Montego Bay United. In this season Davis led them to a 3rd place finish in the regular. In the playoffs that same season, they defeated Arnett Gardens 4-3 on aggregates in semifinals then later defeated Portmore United 2-1 in the finals. He didn't return for the following season due to having previous commitments prior to taking the job at Montego Bay United. 

In 2017, Davis was announced as the new head coach for Mount Pleasant. In the 2019/20 National Premier League season Davis's Mount Pleasant team were 1 point off the topping the league but the season was later cancelled with 4 games remaining. He was later relieved from his managerial duties on July 14, 2021, three games into the 2021 National Premier League season.

On October 26, 2021, it was announced that Paul Davis will return as head coach for Arnett Gardens.

Davis along with 4  other coaches attended a two-day Continuous Professional Development (CPD) Workshop on October 29 and 30. These coaches were awarded a Concacaf B Licence.

Managerial Statistics

Honours

Manager 
Montego Bay United

 National Premier League: 2015-16

References

1962 births
Living people
Jamaica international footballers
Montego Bay United F.C. players
Jamaican footballers
Jamaican expatriate footballers
Expatriate footballers in Israel
Maccabi Netanya F.C. players
Beitar Jerusalem F.C. players
Liga Leumit players
Jamaican expatriate sportspeople in Israel
1991 CONCACAF Gold Cup players
1993 CONCACAF Gold Cup players
Association football forwards